The Eastern Michigan Eagles women's basketball team represents Eastern Michigan University, in Ypsilanti, Michigan, in women's basketball. At the team's establishment in 1977 the team was known as the Hurons, and it, along with all EMU teams, became known as the Eagles in 1991. The team's head coach is Fred Castro, who used to be an assistant coach at the University of Washington.

Season-by-season record
As of the end of the 2015–16 season, the Eagles had a 550–563 record, with a 265–318 record in the Mid-American Conference, which they have played in since 1981. Suzy Merchant has the best record as coach, going 147–91 in nine years before stepping down as coach due to pregnancy four games into the 2006–07 season. The Eagles have won the West Division of the Mid-American conference five times, in 2004, 2006, 2008 and 2012. They won two MAC Tournament titles in that span, one in 2004 and the other in 2012, which are their only appearances in the NCAA Division I women's basketball tournament. In 2012, the Eagles defeated their rival, the Central Michigan Chippewas, 72–71 on a layup by Paige Reddit with only 1.5 seconds left on the game clock to win. They have also reached the WNIT in 2006, 2010, 2012, 2015, and 2016, with an appearance in the Women's Basketball Invitational in 2014.

NCAA tournament results

References

External links
 Basketball reference